is a 1928 black and white Japanese silent film directed by Masahiro Makino. It is an ambitious film in which Makino deals with the difficult issue of the agony of a person who killed for revenge.

External links
 
 

1928 films
Japanese black-and-white films
Japanese silent films